Government Arts College, Chidambaram, is a general degree college located at  C-Mutlur, Chidambaram in Cuddalore district, Tamil Nadu. It was established in the year 1982. The college is affiliated with Thiruvalluvar University. This college offers different courses in arts, commerce and science.

Departments

Science
Physics
Chemistry
Mathematics
Botany
Zoology
Computer Science

Arts and Commerce
Tamil
English
Economics
Physical Education
Business Administration
Commerce

Accreditation
The college is  recognized by the University Grants Commission (UGC).

References

External links

Educational institutions established in 1982
1982 establishments in Tamil Nadu
Colleges affiliated to Thiruvalluvar University
Academic institutions formerly affiliated with the University of Madras